Treroninae is a subfamily of birds from the family Columbidae.

Genera

Alectroenas
Cryptophaps
Hemiphaga
Phapitreron
Treron

References
 ; ; ; ;  2009: A large fruit pigeon (Columbidae) from the Early Miocene of New Zealand. Auk, 126: 649–656. 

 
Bird subfamilies